The 2015 Fotokol attack occurred on 4 and 5 February 2015 when Boko Haram militants reportedly killed at least 91 people by shooting and burning, and injured over 500 in Fotokol, Cameroon. The militants, who are 
based in northeastern Nigeria and active in Chad, Niger and northern Cameroon, also torched mosques and churches of the town. This attack came a day after the regional forces said it had driven Boko Haram from Gambaru, a Nigerian town close by. This was the second foreign country attack by the militants in 2015. This region of Niger is an area where refugees had arrived by the thousands seeking safety from Boko Haram attacks.

Cameroonian troops and Chadian forces have been deployed as a regional force to fight back. The Chadian army has claimed to have killed around 200 militants. The United Nations had also provided support with weapons, logistics, and operations for this multinational effort against Boko Haram.

References

Terrorist incidents in Cameroon in 2015
Boko Haram in Cameroon
Mass murder in 2015
Arson in Africa
Mass shootings in Africa
massacre